The 2023 OFC U-17 Championship was the 19th edition of the OFC U-16/U-17 Championship, the biennial international youth football championship organised by the Oceania Football Confederation (OFC) for the men's under-16/under-17 national teams of Oceania.

The OFC announced on 4 March 2021 that the 2021 OFC U-17 Championship (originally the 2020 OFC U-16 Championship), which would have been hosted by Fiji, had been cancelled due to the COVID-19 pandemic, and Fiji would be retained to host the next edition in 2022.

New Zealand, the seven-time defending champions, successfully defend their title, by won 1-0 the final over New Caledonia and both teams qualified for the 2023 FIFA U-17 World Cup in Peru as the OFC representatives.

Teams
10 of the 11 FIFA-affiliated national teams from the OFC were eligible to enter the tournament. Solomon Islands were excluded from taking part by the OFC Disciplinary and Ethics Committee in regards to the 2018 OFC U-16 Championship.

Starting from 2020, male youth tournaments no longer have a four-team qualifying stage, and all teams compete in one tournament.

Note: All appearance statistics include those in the qualifying stage (2016 and 2018).

Venues
Matches are played at HFC Bank Stadium in Suva and Ba Academy in Ba.

Match officials
The following officials were appointed for the tournament:

Referees
 Timothy Danaskos
 Lachlan Keevers
 Kavitesh Behari
 Veer Singh
 Mederic Lacour
 Calvin Berg
 Nick Waldron
 David Yareboinen
 Ben Aukwai
 Timothy Niu
 Arnold Tari

Assistant referees
 Adriu Naisiroki
 Alan Chenot
 Gareth Sheehan
 Noah Kusunan
 Stephanie Minan
 Malaetala Salanoa
 Natalia Lumukana
 Jeffrey Solodia
 Folio Moeaki
 Jeremy Garae
 Hilmon Sese

Group stage draw
The draw for the group stage was conducted at the OFC Home of Football on the 28 October 2022. Teams were seeded into three pots based on their 2018 OFC U-16 Championship ranking.

Squads

Players born on or after 1 January 2006 were eligible to compete in the tournament.

Group stage
All times are local, FJT (UTC+12).

Group A
Papua New Guinea were originally drawn into position A3 of this group but were removed before the start of the tournament due to not submiting their registration on time.

Group B

Group C

Ranking of third-placed teams

Knockout stage

Draw
The draw for the knockout stage was conducted at the HFC Bank Stadium in Suva
on the 18 January 2023. Teams were seeded into two pots based on the final group stage overall ranking.

Bracket

Quarter-finals

Semi-finals
Winners qualify for 2023 FIFA U-17 World Cup.

Third place match

Final

Awards
The following awards were given at the conclusion of the tournament.

Goalscorers

Qualified teams for FIFA U-17 World Cup
The following two teams from OFC qualify for the 2023 FIFA U-17 World Cup.

1 Bold indicates champions for that year. Italic indicates hosts for that year.

References

External links
oceaniafootball.com

2022
2022–23 in OFC football
2023 in youth association football
2023 FIFA U-17 World Cup qualification
2023 Ofc U-17 Championship
January 2023 sports events in Oceania